Iloilo is a province of the Philippines located in the Western Visayas region.

Iloilo may also refer to:
Places
 Iloilo City, a highly urbanized city and capital of Iloilo but independent from the provincial government
 Iloilo City Proper, a district of Iloilo City
 University of Iloilo, a private university in Iloilo City
 Iloilo National High School, a high school in Iloilo City
 Metro Iloilo–Guimaras or Iloilo–Guimaras Metropolitan Area, a metropolitan area centered on Iloilo City
 Iloilo River
 Iloilo Strait
People
 Josefa Iloilo, president of Fiji from 2000 until 2009
Other
 Iloilo-Negros Air Express, an airline company based in the Philippines
 BRP Iloilo (PS-32), a Philippine Navy corvette
 Iloilo tree or Aglaia argentea, a species of tree native to Iloilo province

See also
 Ilo Ilo, 2013 Singaporean film